Elaine Murphy may refer to:

 Elaine Murphy, Baroness Murphy (born 1947), British politician and member of the House of Lords
 Elaine Murphy (playwright), Irish playwright